Orb Books is a publishing imprint of Tor Books.  Orb Books specialises in trade paperback reprints of science fiction and fantasy works of special merit that are otherwise unavailable in mass-market paperback.

Authors published by Orb

 Poul Anderson
 Isaac Asimov
 Steven Brust
 Orson Scott Card
 Jonathan Carroll
 Storm Constantine
 Charles de Lint
 Lisa Goldstein
 Robert A. Heinlein
 Robert Holdstock
 Robert Jordan
 Gwyneth Jones
 Ursula K. Le Guin
 Fritz Leiber
 Maureen F. McHugh
 Kenneth Morris
 Pat Murphy
 Robert Silverberg
 Kim Stanley Robinson
 L. Neil Smith
 Judith Tarr
 James Tiptree, Jr.
 A. E. Van Vogt
 Jack Vance
 James White
 Jack Williamson
 Gene Wolfe
 Chelsea Quinn Yarbro

External links
 Orb Books
 Tor Books

American speculative fiction publishers
Science fiction publishers
St. Martin's Press